Roberto Calara Mallari (born 27 March 1958) is a Filipino bishop of the Catholic Church who serves as bishop of the Diocese of San Jose in the Philippines.

Biography and priesthood years 
Mallari was born in Masantol, Pampanga, Philippines on 27 March 1958. After completing philosophical and theological studies at San Carlos Seminary in Makati City, he was ordained a deacon of the Archdiocese of San Fernando on 15 March 1982, and a priest of the same on 27 November 1982.

Following his ordination, he served in various roles throughout the archdiocese, including as a pastor at local churches and as a spiritual director and philosophy director at Mother of Good Counsel Seminary in San Fernando, Pampanga.

Episcopate 
On 14 January 2006, Mallari was appointed titular bishop of Erdonia and an auxiliary bishop of the Archdiocese of San Fernando. He was ordained a bishop on his 48th birthday on 27 March 2006 by Cardinal Ricardo Vidal and in June 2007, he became a member and the executive secretary of the Episcopal Commission on Family and Life of the Catholic Bishops' Conference of the Philippines (CBCP).

On 15 May 2012, he was named bishop of the Diocese of San Jose Nueva Ecija by Pope Benedict XVI, and was installed on 10 July 2012. He occupied the position left by Mylo Hubert Vergara who was appointed as Bishop of Pasig in 2011.

After the 2017 killing of Fr. Marcelito Paez, Mallari condemned the crime, called for justice and swift investigation. Paez served as a priest in the Diocese of San Jose before retiring. In 2018, Mallari initiated an organic farming training among the farm workers and their families within the Diocese of San Jose's area of jurisdiction. In 2019, he said that child labor is a challenging problem for the Church and the Philippine society and called for cooperation in solving the child labor problem in the country.

From 2015 to 2021, Mallari served as the chairman of the CBCP's Episcopal Commission on Catechesis and Catholic Education (ECCCE). As the chairman of the said commission, he had aired his comments on several issues about the Philippine education system.

In June 2017, he agreed with the proposal of the Philippine Drug Enforcement Agency's to mandatorily test for drugs the teachers and students. Mallari said that the said proposal will prevent the children to be involved with drugs. During the 2017 World Teachers' Day, he expressed support and gratitude towards the teachers and said that their role is important in youth development and reminded them their social responsibility.

He also said his concern about the 2019 closure of 58 Lumad schools in Davao Region by the Philippine government because these schools were allegedly linked to the New People's Army's activity in the area. He said that this was a "failure" of the government to ensure the security of the students and the region's education system.

In October 2019, Mallari rejected the idea that separating girls and boys in schools will lower the teenage pregnancy and HIV infection in the country. This after the National Youth Commission earlier proposed to have separated rooms for boys and girls in schools to curb the said health issues.

During the COVID-19 pandemic in the Philippines, Mallari said in mid-2020 that internet should be maximized for the students' online learning although he agreed that not all students and their families are capable of the said medium. Later that year, he said that education is one of the most "challenged" sectors during the pandemic and said the schools should find ways for alternative learning medium if online learning is not possible.

References 

Filipino Roman Catholic bishops
21st-century Roman Catholic bishops in the Philippines

1958 births
Living people
People from Pampanga